Exportin 1 (XPO1), also known as chromosomal region maintenance 1 (CRM1), is a eukaryotic protein that mediates the nuclear export of various proteins and RNAs.

History 
XPO1 (CRM1) originally was identified in the fission yeast Schizosaccharomyces pombe in a genetic screen, and investigators determined that it was involved in control of the chromosome structure. It was later shown to be the nuclear transport receptor for cargos with leucine-rich nuclear export signals (NES). The structural details of the interaction of XPO1 with its cargos were revealed two decades after the gene was identified.

Function 

XPO1 mediates NES-dependent protein transport. It exports several hundreds of different proteins from the nucleus. XPO1 is involved in the nuclear export of ribosomal subunits. XPO1 plays a role in export of various RNAs including U snRNAs, rRNAs (as a part of ribosomal subunits), and some mRNAs.

Medical relevance 
XPO1 is involved in various viral infections. For example, it is required for the nuclear export of HIV-1 RNA in complex with the viral protein Rev, an event that is a crucial part of the infection cycle.  XPO1 is affected in some cancer types  and is therefore viewed as a target for development of anti-cancer drugs. Selinexor, a drug specifically targeting XPO1, was approved by the FDA for treatment of multiple myeloma.

Interactions 

XPO1 has been shown to interact with:

 APC, 
 CDKN1B,
 CIITA, 
 NMD3, 
 Nucleoporin 62, 
 RANBP1, 
 RANBP3, 
 Ran, 
 SMARCB1,  and
 p53.

See also 
 Karyopherin
Importin
Nuclear transport
Nuclear export signal

References

Further reading

External links 
 3D electron microscopy structures of CRM1 from the EM Data Bank(EMDB)